Pompeia Plotina (died 121/122) was Roman empress from 98 to 117 as the wife of Trajan. She was renowned for her interest in philosophy, and her virtue, dignity and simplicity. She was particularly devoted to the Epicurean philosophical school in Athens, Greece. She is often viewed as having provided Romans with fairer taxation, improved education, assisted the poor, and created tolerance in Roman society.

Early life 
Plotina was raised in Tejada la Vieja (Escacena del Campo) in the province of Hispania. She was possibly born in Nemausus (Nîmes) during the reign of Roman Emperor Nero (r. 54–68), however she could have been born in the 70s. She was the daughter of Lucius Pompeius. Another woman from Nemausus named Pompeia L. f. Marullina may have been her relative. Historian Christian Settipani believe they could be sisters. Based on her cognomen Plotina there has been some speculated that her mother was named "Plotia" or similar. The finding of an inscription in Pompei naming a woman named Ulpia Plotina has led to speculation that she and Trajan were related. Not a lot is known about Plotina's early life.

Marriage and life as Empress 

Trajan married her before his accession and, although a happy marriage, they had no known children.

Upon entering the imperial palace following Trajan's ascension, Plotina is said to have turned to those watching her and carefully announced, "I enter here the kind of woman I would like to be when I depart." It was through acts like this she sought to dispel the bad taste of domestic strife that had characterized the reign of Domitian as well as the Julio-Claudian dynasty, where she acted like a traditional Roman matron, and was associated with chaste goddesses like Vesta, the guardian of Rome's sacred fire, and Minerva, goddess of war and wisdom. In 100, Trajan awarded her with the title of Augusta, but she did not accept the title until 105. Plotina did not appear also on the coinage until 112.

When the future emperor Hadrian and his sister lost their parents at 10 or 11 years old, Trajan and the Roman officer Publius Acilius Attianus became their guardians; Hadrian was a first cousin once removed to Trajan (Trajan's father and Hadrian's paternal grandmother were siblings). Plotina was the matchmaker between Hadrian and his future wife Vibia Sabina.

Death of Trajan and accession of Hadrian 
When a letter Trajan was said to have composed on his deathbed appeared in Rome with Plotina's signature on it, in which he adopted Hadrian and named him successor to the Empire, suspicions were raised. It was rumoured that Attianus and the Empress Plotina had been lovers, both were very fond of Hadrian their ward, both were present at Trajan's deathbed at Selinus in Cilicia in August 117, and that the two had helped secure Hadrian's succession by forging Trajan's will.

Annelise Freisenbruch dismisses this accusation: "Plotina, the silent spouse of the second century, thus joined Livia, Agrippina the Younger, and Domitia in the gallery of Roman imperial women accused of covering up or conspiring in their husband's deaths." Freisenbruch notes that there are many plausible explanations why Plotina's signature might legitimately be on this declaration: Trajan may have simply been too weak to sign the letter himself. Freisenbruch also notes these kinds of accusations have dogged the spouses of rulers through the centuries.

Along with Attianus and Matidia, the grieving widow Plotina accompanied Trajan's body to Seleucia and his ashes to Rome.

Later years 
It was while a widow that Plotina's best documented action took place. During the year 121, while the emperor Hadrian was inspecting the provinces, Plotina and he engaged in a series of letters discussing who should be the new head of the Epicurean school of philosophy in Athens. She petitioned for a change in the law, which would allow Popillius Theotimus, the acting head of the school, to become the actual head; in response, Hadrian agreed with her argument, and the relevant letters were preserved in a series of inscriptions. Freisenbruch notes, "In stark contrast to her passive anonymity in the literary record, this inscription from Athens recasts Plotina as a highly educated woman, active on behalf of causes close to her heart and with the kind of access to the emperor once enjoyed by Livia."

When Plotina died of illness, she was deified. Her ashes joined Trajan's in the base of Trajan's Column. In 123, Hadrian built a basilica in her honor at Nîmes, in Provence.

Notes

References

Further reading
  Minaud, Gérard, Les vies de 12 femmes d’empereur romain - Devoirs, Intrigues & Voluptés , Paris, L’Harmattan, 2012, ch. 6,  La vie de Plotine, femme de Trajan, pp. 147–168.

External link

1st-century births
120s deaths
1st-century Roman empresses
2nd-century Roman empresses
Deified Roman empresses
Hadrian
Trajan
Augustae
Pompeii (Romans)